Hines is an unincorporated community in Beltrami County, Minnesota, United States. Hines has a post office with ZIP code 56647.

Hines was named for William Hines, a lumberman.

References

Unincorporated communities in Beltrami County, Minnesota
Unincorporated communities in Minnesota